The 2014 Nielsen Pro Tennis Championship was a professional tennis tournament played on hard courts. It was the 23rd edition of the tournament which was part of the 2014 ATP Challenger Tour. It took place in Winnetka, Illinois, between 30 June and 6 July 2014.

Singles main-draw entrants

Seeds

 1 Rankings are as of June 23, 2014.

Other entrants
The following players received wildcards into the singles main draw:
  Marcos Giron
  Jared Hiltzik
  Evan King
  Raymond Sarmiento

The following player received entry as a lucky loser into the singles main draw:
  Jeff Dadamo

The following players received entry from the qualifying draw:
  Ronnie Schneider
  Mackenzie McDonald
  Dennis Nevolo
  Eric Quigley

Champions

Singles

 Denis Kudla  def.  Farrukh Dustov, 6–2, 6–2

Doubles

 Thanasi Kokkinakis /  Denis Kudla def.  Evan King /  Raymond Sarmiento, 6–2, 7–6(7–4)

External links
Official website

Nielsen Pro Tennis Championship
Nielsen Pro Tennis Championship
Nielsen Pro Tennis Championship
Nielsen Pro Tennis Championship
2014 in sports in Illinois
Niel